Bonnetina minax also known as Mexican copperhead tarantula, is a tarantula which was first described by David Ortiz and Oscar F. Francke in 2017. It is found in Mexico, in the state of Michoacán, and is named after the latin adjective "minax" that means menacing, as the red found in is carapace is usually aposematic coloration.

Description 
The tarantula's carapace is a copper color, with a black opisthosoma covered with copper hairs, and a copper colored urticating patch. The legs are mainly grey with some copper coloration here and there and a deep black femur.

Habitat 
They are found in Mexico in the state of Guerrero in the San Lucas Municipality, where its mainly thorny scrubland. It is found 300m above sea level, the average yearly rainfall is 900mm and temperatures between 20 to 35ºC. With plants such as the Mexican giant cactus, amole, and cueramo.

Behavior 
They are terrestrial and opportunistic burrowers, and are quite calm, liking to keep in their hide. They will rarely show defensive behaviors, and they own a weak venom as they are part of the New World.

References 

Spiders of North America
Spiders of Mexico
Theraphosidae
Spiders described in 2017